A Caseira e a Catarina is a very popular Brazilian play written by Ariano Suassuna that was first published in 1962.

Plot
The plot has one act. It is about a woman betrayed by her husband. Angry and in sorrow, she makes a deal with the devil and asks him to take her husband and his lover to hell.

References

1962 plays
Comedy plays
Brazilian plays
Plays by Ariano Suassuna